Headless Cross is the fourteenth studio album by English heavy metal band Black Sabbath. Released on 24 April 1989, it was the group's second album to feature singer Tony Martin, the first to feature drummer Cozy Powell, and the only album with bassist Laurence Cottle.

Recording and production
According to Tony Iommi's autobiography, Iron Man: My Journey Through Heaven and Hell with Black Sabbath, the band were dropped from Warner Bros. Records in 1988 after an eighteen-year deal and after Vertigo Records had also dropped them. He met Miles Copeland, who owned I.R.S. Records at the time. Copeland told him: "You know how to write albums, you know what people want. You do it and I'm fine with it." This persuaded Iommi to sign to I.R.S.

Iommi asked British drummer Cozy Powell – who had played with Jeff Beck, Rainbow, MSG and Whitesnake, among others – if he wanted to join Sabbath. Iommi and Powell began writing songs at the former's home, with Tony Martin joining for rehearsals. Iommi got a call from Gloria Butler, wife and manager of Geezer Butler, who said the bassist wanted to rejoin Sabbath. However, Butler instead joined Ozzy Osbourne's No Rest for the Wicked tour lineup. Iommi and Nicholls had originally thought to bring Ronnie James Dio back or again ask David Coverdale to join the band, but Powell convinced him to keep Martin on. Powell and Iommi produced the album themselves.

Due to Jo Burt's exit early in the sessions, Laurence Cottle played bass as a session musician rather than an official member. He appeared in the video for the title track, but was not featured in promotional photos. For the tour, the lineup was completed by Whitesnake and Gary Moore bassist Neil Murray.

Conceptually, the lyrics have predominantly occult and Satanic elements; arguably the only time in the band's career where an entire album is based on such ideas rather than select songs.

"When Death Calls" has a guitar solo by Queen guitarist Brian May.

Two songs had their titles changed due to Ozzy Osbourne releasing songs with the same titles on his album No Rest for the Wicked. "Call of the Wild" was originally titled "Hero", and "Devil & Daughter" was originally titled "Devil's Daughter".

"Call of the Wild" and "Devil & Daughter" are also the only songs that do not end with a slow fade out with vocal ad libs by Tony Martin; while "Nightwing" does have a fade out, it does not feature any vocal ad libs. According to Martin, the vocals on "Nightwing" were the original guide vocals, because Iommi thought they sounded better than later recordings.

"'Black Moon' was written when Ray Gillen was the singer… with Tony Iommi, Geoff Nicholls, Eric Singer and Dave Spitz," noted Martin. "They were left with one track that had no voice on it, and Tony asked me if I could sing something on it. I wrote and sang the lyrics in one day! We never played it [live] because there are too many Sabbath favourites."

According to the sleeve notes, the cover image was designed by Kevin Wimlett. The sleeve was designed by The Leisure Process at their offices in Little Portland Street London. The UK sleeve was in black-and-white, while the German release added colour.

Touring
For the live show in support of this album, "Ave Satani", the main theme from Jerry Goldsmith's Oscar-winning soundtrack for The Omen, was used as the intro tape, beginning as the house lights went down. This would then segue into a taped recording of "The Gates of Hell" before the band would begin the show with "Headless Cross". The intro-tape of "Ave Satani/The Gates of Hell" was used many times, during various tours over the years, up until the Reunion shows. "Headless Cross" would be played on all subsequent tours when Tony Martin was in the band but the only other track from the "Headless Cross" album to last beyond that tour was "When Death Calls".

Black Sabbath were one of the first bands to tour Russia, in 1989, after Mikhail Gorbachev opened the country to western acts. Black Sabbath played a total of 25 shows, 13 at Moscow's Olympic Hall and 12 at EKS Hall in Leningrad. The two (afternoon/evening) 19 November shows were professionally filmed and eventually released on DVD in some territories in 2008.

Tony Martin currently tours with a live band named after the album, going by the name of "Tony Martin's Headless Cross". They included another former Black Sabbath member, Geoff Nicholls, until his death in 2017.

Singles
"Headless Cross" yielded two radio singles, an edit of the title track and "Devil & Daughter". The former was available as a 7", personally signed by Iommi, and a 12" poster-sleeve, this latter being limited to 2,500 copies.
"Devil & Daughter" was released as a 7" picture disc, a 12 picture-sleeve, and a 7" box-set, containing the single, some postcards and a stencil of the band's logo.
 "Black Moon" was originally a B-side on "The Shining" single, re-recorded for Headless Cross.

The bonus track "Cloak and Dagger" was the B-side to the "Headless Cross" single, and was later on the vinyl picture disc edition. At the time of the album's release, the only CD versions of the "Headless Cross" edit and of "Cloak and Dagger" were on separate promotional CDs.

Reception

Headless Cross was praised by critics and fans as the best Sabbath album in years. Said AllMusic's Eduardo Rivadavia: "Arguably the finest Black Sabbath album since Ozzy or Dio, Headless Cross also featured one of Black Sabbath's most formidable lineups... In short, for those wise enough to appreciate Black Sabbath's discography beyond the Osbourne and Dio essentials, there can be no better place to start than Headless Cross or its worthy predecessor, The Eternal Idol".

The album spent eight weeks on the Billboard 200 chart, peaking at number 115. Sales in the US were low, leading to the curtailment of the tour. Iommi told Sabbath fanzine Southern Cross: "When we had the first record out with I.R.S., Cozy and myself went into record stores in Toronto, Canada, where we are pretty big. Nobody could get the record, it wasn't in the shops... unbelievable. We had such a fight with the local rep. I really came close to chinning him – it really was that bad. At the end of the day, it's us that suffer. They say, 'Oh, it didn't sell.' How can it sell if you haven't got the record in the shops?"

In 2005, the album was ranked number 403 in Rock Hard magazine's book The 500 Greatest Rock & Metal Albums of All Time.

In 2021, Kerrang! ranked Headless Cross as the seventh-best Black Sabbath album in a best-to-worst ranking of the band's discography.

Track listing

Personnel
Tony Martin – vocals
Tony Iommi – guitars, production
Laurence Cottle – bass
Geoff Nicholls − keyboards
Cozy Powell – drums, production

Additional personnel
Brian May – first guitar solo on "When Death Calls"

Technical personnel
Sean Lynch – engineer, mixing
Jeremy Lewis – post-production equalisation and remixing on "Nightwing"

Charts

References

External links
 

1989 albums
Black Sabbath albums
I.R.S. Records albums